Congregation Ohabai Sholom, known as The Temple, is a Reform synagogue in Nashville, Tennessee notable for the elaborate, Moorish Revival Vine Street Temple that was its home from 1874 until its demolition in 1954.

History
Ohabai Sholom was founded as an Orthodox congregation in the 1840s in the home of  Mr. and Mrs. Isaac Garretson on South Summer Street (5th Avenue). 
The congregation purchased land for a cemetery in 1851 and in 1874 dedicated  the striking, Moorish Revival Vine Street Temple. In 1873 the congregation was one of the founding members of the Union of American Hebrew Congregations, now the Union for Reform Judaism. In 1945, the Temple gave Temple B'nai Israel in Tupelo, Mississippi, its first Torah.
The congregation moved to its present building in 1955.

Notable members

 Herb Rich (1928-2008), 2x All-Pro NFL football player

External links
 Ohabai Sholom website

Images of the 1874 Moorish Revival building
http://www.tennessee.gov/tsla/exhibits/tnjews/images/vinestreet1.jpg
http://www.pbase.com/deadelvis/image/21542107
https://web.archive.org/web/20081118135649/http://www.nashvillewebreview.com/automat/nashville/churches/synagog/VineStreet.htm

References

Buildings and structures in Nashville, Tennessee
Founding members of the Union for Reform Judaism
Reform synagogues in Tennessee
Moorish Revival synagogues
Moorish Revival architecture in Tennessee
Culture of Nashville, Tennessee